Spalerosophis atriceps is a species of snake in the family Colubridae. The species is endemic to South Asia.

Geographic range
S. atriceps is found in northwestern India, Nepal, and Pakistan.

The type locality given in the original description is "Himalaya ".

Habitat
The preferred habitats of S. atriceps are deserts, rocky areas, and scrub forest.

Description
Dorsally, it is pale orange, pink, or yellow, with scattered black flecks. The dorsal surface of the head is either entirely black or black and deep red. The sides of the head and the nape of the neck are deep red. Ventrally, it is pinkish.

Behavior
S. atriceps is nocturnal.

Reproduction
S. atriceps is oviparous. In India, the adult female lays a clutch of 3 to 8 eggs in October.

References

Further reading
Fischer JG (1885). "Herpetologische Bemerkungen ". Jahrbuch der Hamburgischen Wissenschaftlichen Anstalten 2: 82–121. (Zamenis diadema Var. atriceps, new variety, pp. 102–103). (in German).
Minton SA Jr (1966). "A contribution to the herpetology of West Pakistan". Bulletin of the American Museum of Natural History 134: 29–184. (Spalerosophis atriceps, new combination, pp. 124–126).
Smith MA (1943). The Fauna of British India, Ceylon and Burma, Including the Whole of the Indo-Chinese Sub-region. Reptilia and Amphibia. Vol. III.—Serpentes. London: Secretary of State for India. (Taylor and Francis, printers). xii + 583 pp. (Coluber diadema atriceps, pp. 174–175).
Whitaker R, Captain A (2007). Snakes of India: The Field Guide. Chennai: Draco Books. 495 pp. .

Reptiles described in 1885
Reptiles of India
Reptiles of Pakistan
Spalerosophis